Michel Village is a northern hamlet in Saskatchewan. It is located on the western shore of Peter Pond Lake at the end of Highway 925 north of Dillon. There were 66 residents in Michel Village in 2011. The mayor is Cliff Coombs.

Demographics 

See also 
 List of communities in Northern Saskatchewan
 List of communities in Saskatchewan

References 

Division No. 18, Saskatchewan
Northern hamlets in Saskatchewan
Dene communities